Killmacuagh (Cooke) is a townland in Athlone, County Westmeath, Ireland. The townland is in the civil parish of St. Mary's.

The townland stands in the southeast area of the town, the Dublin–Westport/Galway railway line passes through the area in the south.  Kilmacuagh (Castlemaine) borders the townland to the east, Derries borders the area to the west and Bunnavally is to the north.

References 

Townlands of County Westmeath